Marguerite Lamour (Marguerite Arzel; born 12 June 1956 in Ploudalmézeau, Finistère) is the mayor of Ploudalmézeau. She was a member of the National Assembly of France from 2002 to 2012.  She represented the Finistère department,  and is a member of the Union for a Popular Movement.

Decorations
Chevalier (Knight) of the French National Order of Merit by decree of the President of the Republic of France dated 14 November 2012.

References

1956 births
Living people
People from Finistère
Union for French Democracy politicians
Union for a Popular Movement politicians
Women members of the National Assembly (France)
Deputies of the 12th National Assembly of the French Fifth Republic
Deputies of the 13th National Assembly of the French Fifth Republic
21st-century French women politicians
Chevaliers of the Légion d'honneur